Federico Angiulli (born 4 March 1992) is an Italian footballer who plays for Sambenedettese as a left winger or left defender.

Club career
Born in Segrate, Angiulli made his professional debuts with Valle d'Aosta, in Serie D. After the club's bankruptcy he moved to Pergocrema, in Lega Pro Prima Divisione.

On 16 July 2012 Angiulli joined Avellino, taking part of the squad who won the 2012–13 Lega Pro Prima Divisione.

On 19 October 2013 Angiulli made his Serie B debut, coming on as a late substitute in a 4–1 home routing over Carpi.

On 23 July 2014 he was signed by Lega Pro club Reggiana in a two-year deal.

In January 2016 he was loaned to Benevento with which reached the top spot in the Pro League Group C; at the end of the fall season at Reggiana.

On 14 January 2017 official on his transfer to Pisa playing in Serie B.

On 20 July 2018, he signed with Catania. On 20 August 2019 he joined Sambenedettese on loan with an option to buy.

On 9 September 2020, Sambenedettese acquired his rights and he signed a 2-year contract.

On 27 August 2021, he moved to Triestina. Just over a month later, after Sambenedettese was re-admitted to Serie D, he returned to it.

References

External links

1992 births
Living people
People from Segrate
Footballers from Lombardy
Association football wingers
Association football defenders
Italian footballers
Serie B players
Serie C players
Serie D players
U.S. Pergolettese 1932 players
U.S. Avellino 1912 players
Benevento Calcio players
A.C. Reggiana 1919 players
Pisa S.C. players
Ternana Calcio players
Catania S.S.D. players
A.S. Sambenedettese players
U.S. Triestina Calcio 1918 players
Sportspeople from the Metropolitan City of Milan